An inner tube is an inflatable ring that forms the interior of some pneumatic tires. The tube is inflated with a valve stem, and fits inside of the casing of the tire. The inflated inner tube provides structural support and suspension, while the outer tire provides grip and protects the more fragile tube. They are widely used in bicycles and are also used in many motorcycles and heavy road vehicles such as trucks and buses. They are now less common in other wheeled vehicles because of the benefits of having no tube, such as the ability to operate at low pressure and at high pressure (unlike a tube tire, which would pinch at low pressure and burst at high pressure), without going flat. Large inner rings also make effective flotation devices and are widely used in the leisure activity of tubing.

Material
The tube is made out of a mix of natural and synthetic rubber. Natural rubber is less prone to punctures and is often more pliable, while synthetic rubber is cheaper. Often racing bikes will have a higher percentage of natural rubber than regular bikes.

Performance
Inner tubes will wear out over time. This makes them thinner, and more likely to burst. According to Dunlop, inner tubes should be changed every 6 months. Inner tubes also tend to be slower than tubeless tires because of the friction between the casing and the inner tube. Tires that use tubes are on average lighter, as the tube can be made relatively thin. As the tubing is sown to the tire, if punctured, the tire can still be ridden flat. They are reportedly more comfortable to use, if attached to the bicycle properly.

See also
 Tubeless tires

References

Tires